The Stepdaughters is a 2018 Philippine television drama series broadcast by GMA Network. Directed by Paul Sta. Ana, it stars Megan Young and Katrina Halili in the title role. It premiered on February 12, 2018 on the network's Afternoon Prime line up replacing Impostora. The series concluded on October 19, 2018 with a total of 178 episodes. It was replaced by Ika-5 Utos in its timeslot.

The series is streaming online on YouTube.

Premise
A story of two women, Mayumi and Isabelle who dislike each other. They will eventually become stepsisters when Mayumi's mother marries Isabelle's father.

Cast and characters

Lead cast
 Megan Young as Mayumi Dela Rosa-Almeda 
 Katrina Halili as Isabelle "Belle" Salvador

Supporting cast
 Mikael Daez as Francisco "Francis" Almeda
 Glydel Mercado as Luisa "Loreng" Manor-Salvador
 Gary Estrada as Hernando "Hernan" Salvador
 Sef Cadayona as Bryce Morales
 Samantha Lopez as Daphne Salimbagon
 Edgar Allan Guzman as Froilan Almeda
 Madeleine Nicolas as Baby Samonte

Recurring cast
 Karenina Haniel as Sasha
 Emmanuelle Vera as Nikki
 Donita Nose Solano as Ariana
 Lovely Abella as Mylene
 Nathan Lopez as Benson
 Valentin "Nani" Naguit as Caloy
 Kristoffer King as Jigs
 Zackie Rivera as Jenjen
 Chromewell Cosio as Joel
 Froilan Sales as Henry

Guest cast
 Angelu de Leon as Brenda Salvador
 Allan Paule as Mario Dela Rosa
 Irma Adlawan as Susanna Almeda
 Alicia Alonzo as Felicidad "Fely" Almeda
 Rissian Rein Adriano as young Mayumi 
 Alessandra Alonzo as young Isabelle
 Shakira A. Ceasar as young Sasha
 Zymic Jaranilla as young Froilan
 Adrian Pascual as young Francis
 Joyce Ching as Grace Dela Rosa
 Liezel Lopez as Marigold
 Tess Bomb as Tess
 Dea Formilleza as Lani
 Gerald Madrid as David
 Carlo Gonzales as Louie
 Orlando Sol as Emman
 Kevin Sagra as Kenji
 Marife Necesito as Diana
 Wilma Doesnt as Zoraya
 Sophie Albert as Lily
 Khaine Dela Cruz as Yuri Buenafe
 Carla Humphries as Ailene Buenafe

Ratings
According to AGB Nielsen Philippines' Nationwide Urban Television Audience Measurement People in television homes, the pilot episode of The Stepdaughters earned a 6.5% rating. While the final episode scored a 6.3% rating. The series got its highest rating on May 9, 2018 with an 8.6% rating.

Accolades

References

External links
 
 

2018 Philippine television series debuts
2018 Philippine television series endings
Filipino-language television shows
GMA Network drama series
Television shows set in the Philippines